In musical rights management, the CAE number was previously used to identify rights holders. A CAE number is 9 digits long.

It is being phased out and has been replaced by the IPI code.

References
http://www.prsformusic.com/creators/helpcentre/Pages/Publishermembers.aspx

Copyright law